"Love Nwantiti" is a song by Nigerian singer and songwriter CKay, released in 2019 as the second track from his second extended play Ckay the First by Chocolate City through Warner Music Group.  A remix of the song titled "Love Nwantiti (Ah Ah Ah)" featuring Nigerian singer Joeboy and Ghanaian singer Kuami Eugene, released as a single in 2020, became a commercial success in Nigeria, Middle East, North Africa and in many European club venues, as well as the subject of collaborations with few local artists for localised variations. The French version included vocals by French rapper Franglish.
 
In 2021 the song charted across Europe, Australia, Latin America, and New Zealand, reaching number one in India, the Netherlands, Norway and Switzerland, and gained popularity across TikTok. It also peaked at number 3 on the UK Singles Chart and reached number one on the UK Indie Singles Chart. It also reached No. 26 on the US Billboard Hot 100, it peaked at No. 2 on the  Billboard Global 200 and appeared on the Canadian Hot 100. On 4 October 2021, it peaked at number 30 on the Nigeria TurnTable Top 50 chart and reached number 14 on 20 October 2021.
 
Although in most countries the main remix by CKay featuring Joeboy and Kuami Eugene was released, another version, the North African remix with ElGrande Toto became a hit in Germany, Italy, Austria and Denmark. A version by De La Ghetto made a brief appearance in France, although the main CKay/Joeboy/Kuami Eugene version topped the French Singles Chart.

Music videos 
A music video for "Love Nwantiti (Ah Ah Ah)" was released on 14 February 2020, it was directed by Naya visuals and it became the first Afrobeats music video to surpass 300 million views on YouTube. A video for the North African remix featuring  ElGrande Toto was released on November 4, 2021. It was shot in Lagos and was directed by TG Omori, it surpassed 34 million views after a month of release on YouTube.

A performance video for the acoustic version was also released in 2020 and has since garnered 200 million views on YouTube.

Impact 
CKay's Spotify followers increased to over 31 million following the rising popularity of the song, it also has been subject to five remixes. Various covers performed around the world with different instruments and sung in a variety of languages most notably Hindi, French and Spanish have also been uploaded on social media platform attracting their own popularity, the song trended across Tiktok and in the middle east and Asia, it also soundtracked over three million Tiktok videos and was subject to many local variants.

The song is a sleeper hit. It first appeared on his 2019 extended play; however, it took two years from that appearance for the song to actually gain mass popularity from TikTok and other platforms.

Dance routine 
A dance routine for the song was created by Tiktoker Tracy Joseph which has been used in several videos by people participating in the #Lovenwantitichallenge.

As of December 2021, "Love Nwantiti" is the most certified Afrobeats song. It also became the second song by a Nigerian artist to debut on the Billboard Hot 100 and the Billboard Global 200 after "Essence”.

Versions
2019: "Love Nwantiti"
2020: "Love Nwantiti" (Acoustic Version)
2020: "Love Nwantiti" (Remix) (featuring Joeboy and Kuami Eugene)

Collaborations
"Love Nwantiti (Ah Ah Ah)" (Remix) (Digital Chocolate City / Warner) – 3:08	
"Love Nwantiti (Ah Ah Ah)" (North African Remix) – CKay featuring ElGrandeToto – 2:15	
"Love Nwantiti (Ah Ah Ah)" (French Remix) – CKay featuring Franglish – 2:15
"Love Nwantiti" (Remix) – Ckay featuring Dj Yo! & Ax'el – 3:08

Accolades

Charts

Weekly charts

Year-end charts

Certifications

Release history

References

2020 songs
2020 singles
Number-one singles in Norway
Number-one singles in Switzerland
Number-one singles in India
Number-one singles in Portugal
SNEP Top Singles number-one singles
Internet memes introduced in 2021
CKay songs
Nigerian afropop songs